Dick, Rich, Richie,  Rick, or Richard Hart may refer to:

Sports
 Dick Hart (American football) (born 1943), American football player
 Dick Hart (athlete) (1927–1991), American Olympic athlete
 Dick Hart (golfer) (1935–2013), American professional golfer
 Dick Hart (footballer) (1881–1934), Australian rules footballer
 Rich Hart (born 1952), American former professional ice hockey defenceman
 Richard Hart (curler) (born 1968), Canadian curler
 Richie Hart (born 1978), Scottish footballer
 Richard Hart (sailor), sailor from Great Britain, in 2012 Finn Gold Cup

Politicians
 Richard Hart (died 1578), MP for Exeter
 Richard Hart (Jamaican politician) (1917–2013), Jamaican historian, solicitor and politician
 Richard Meredith Hart (1811–1864), American cattleman and politician
 Richard O. Hart (1927–2018), American lawyer and politician
 Richard Harte (died 1616), MP for Nottingham

Others
 Richard Hart (actor) (1915–1951), American movie, TV, and stage actor
 Richard Hart (jazz guitarist) (born 1955), jazz guitarist, composer, arranger
 Richard Hart (journalist) (1980s), American journalist
 Rick Hart (Australian businessman) (fl. late 20th century), Australian entrepreneur and president of Fremantle Football Club
 Rick Hart (sound engineer), Academy Award nominated sound engineer
 Richard "Two-Gun" Hart (1892–1952), a.k.a. James Vincenzo Capone, American law-enforcement officer
 Dick Hart (painter) (born 1920), British painter